The Body is a 1974 Italian erotic drama film written and directed by Luigi Scattini.

Plot 
In Trinidad, Princess arouses a violent passion in two men, the young penniless Alain and the mature and alcoholic Antoine.

Cast 

Zeudi Araya as Princess
Enrico Maria Salerno as  Antoine  
Leonard Mann as Alan
Carroll Baker as  	Madeliene

See also     
 List of Italian films of 1974

References

External links

1970s Italian-language films
1970s erotic drama films
Italian erotic drama films
Films set in Trinidad and Tobago
Films directed by Luigi Scattini
Films scored by Piero Umiliani
1974 drama films
1974 films
1970s Italian films